The 2006–07 Barangay Ginebra Kings season was the 28th season of the franchise in the Philippine Basketball Association (PBA).

Key dates
August 20: The 2006 PBA Draft took place in Fort Bonifacio, Taguig.

Philippine Cup awards
Best Player of the Conference: Mark Caguioa 
Finals Most Valuable Player: Jayjay Helterbrand

Roster

Philippine Cup

Game log

|- bgcolor="#bbffbb" 
| 1
| October 1
| Welcoat
| 102–69 
| Caguioa (23)
| 
| 
| Araneta Coliseum
| 1–0
|- bgcolor="#bbffbb" 
| 2
| October 7
| Purefoods
| 86–67
| 
| 
| 
| Dumaguete
| 2–0
|- bgcolor="#bbffbb" 
| 3
| October 11
| Air21
| 114–113
| Menk (27)
| 
| 
| Araneta Coliseum
| 3–0
|- bgcolor="#edbebf" 
| 4
| October 15
| Red Bull
| 79–84
| Caguioa (25)
| 
| 
| Araneta Coliseum
| 3–1
|- bgcolor="#edbebf" 
| 5
| October 22
| San Miguel
| 97–101
| Caguioa (20)
| 
| 
| Cuneta Astrodome
| 3–2
|- bgcolor="#bbffbb" 
| 6
| October 26
| Coca Cola
| 102–75
| Salvacion (22)
| 
| 
| Cabagan, Isabela
| 4–2
|- bgcolor="#bbffbb" 
| 7
| October 29
| Alaska
| 98–91
| Macapagal (28)
| 
| 
| Araneta Coliseum
| 5–2

|- bgcolor="#edbebf" 
| 8
| November 5
| Purefoods
| 84–88
| 
| 
| 
| Araneta Coliseum
| 5–3
|- bgcolor="#bbffbb" 
| 9
| November 10
| San Miguel
| 92–87
| Caguioa (28)
| 
| 
| Araneta Coliseum
| 6–3
|- bgcolor="#edbebf" 
| 10
| November 12
| Talk 'N Text
| 98–113
| Menk (29)
| 
| 
| Araneta Coliseum
| 6–4
|- bgcolor="#bbffbb" 
| 11
| November 18
| Sta.Lucia
| 123–117 
| Caguioa (32)
| 
| 
| Puerto Princesa
| 7–4
|- bgcolor="#bbffbb" 
| 12
| November 24
| Coca Cola
| 84–78
| Caguioa (23)
| 
| 
| Cuneta Astrodome
| 8–4
|- bgcolor="#bbffbb" 
| 13
| November 29
| Welcoat
| 87–66
| Hatfield (24)
| 
| 
| Araneta Coliseum
| 9–4

|- bgcolor="#bbffbb" 
| 14
| December 3
| Air 21
| 116–105
| Caguioa (35)
| 
| 
| Araneta Coliseum
| 10–4
|- bgcolor="#bbffbb" 
| 15
| December 9
| Alaska
| 108–101
| Hatfield (24)
| 
| 
| Lucena City
| 11–4
|- bgcolor="#bbffbb" 
| 16
| December 15
| Sta.Lucia
| 109–89
| 
| 
| 
| Ynares Center
| 12–4
|- bgcolor="#bbffbb" 
| 17
| December 20
| Red Bull
| 94–84
| Hatfield (25)
| 
| 
| Araneta Coliseum
| 13–4
|- bgcolor="#edbebf" 
| 18
| December 25
| Talk 'N Text
| 104–115
| Helterbrand (29)
| 
| 
| Araneta Coliseum
| 13–5

Fiesta Conference

Game log

|- bgcolor="#edbebf"
| 1
| March 11
| Alaska
| 98–100
| Nealy (31)
| 
| 
| Araneta Coliseum
| 0–1
|- bgcolor="#bbffbb"
| 2
| March 16
| Welcoat
| 99–97
| Nealy (26)
| 
| 
| Araneta Coliseum
| 1–1
|- bgcolor="#bbffbb"
| 3
| March 18
| Red Bull
| 111–105
| Nealy (21)
| 
| 
| Araneta Coliseum
| 2–1
|- bgcolor="#bbffbb"
| 4
| March 22
| Coca Cola
| 101–97
| Nealy (26)
| 
| 
| The Arena in San Juan
| 3–1
|- bgcolor="#bbffbb"
| 5
| March 25
| San Miguel
| 102–84
| Nealy (43)
| 
| 
| Araneta Coliseum
| 4–1
|- bgcolor="#edbebf"
| 6
| March 30
| Talk 'N Text
| 92–99
| Nealy (34)
| 
| 
| Araneta Coliseum
| 4–2

|- bgcolor="#bbffbb"
| 7
| April 1
| Sta.Lucia
| 112–101
| Nealy (37)
| 
| 
| Araneta Coliseum
| 5–2
|- bgcolor="#bbffbb"
| 8
| April 8
| Red Bull
| 100–84
| Nealy (38)
| Nealy (16)
| 
| Araneta Coliseum
| 6–2
|- bgcolor="#bbffbb"
| 9
| April 13
| Purefoods
| 92–82
|  
| 
| 
| Al Ahli Sports Club (Dubai)
| 7–2
|- bgcolor="#bbffbb"
| 10
| April 20
| Coca Cola
| 105–93
| Nealy (32) 
| Nealy (12)
| Nealy (11)
| Araneta Coliseum
| 8–2
|-bgcolor="#bbffbb"

|-bgcolor="#bbffbb"
| 11
| May 2
| Welcoat
| 103–71
| Nealy (38)
| 
| 
| Araneta Coliseum
| 9–2
|-bgcolor="#bbffbb"
| 12
| May 5
| Air21
| 136–115 
| 
| 
| 
| Angeles City
| 10–2
|-bgcolor="#edbebf"
| 13
| May 11
| Alaska
| 91–97
| Nealy (25) Salvacion (25)
| 
| 
| Ynares Center
| 10–3
|- bgcolor="#edbebf"
| 14
| May 13
| Purefoods
| 105–117
| Nealy (32) Tubid (30)
| 
| 
| Araneta Coliseum
| 10–4
|-bgcolor="#edbebf"
| 15
| May 19
| Talk 'N Text
| 96–102
| 
| 
| 
| Butuan
| 10–5
|- bgcolor="#bbffbb"
| 16
| May 25
| Sta.Lucia
| 88–84
| Nealy (38) 
| 
| 
| Ynares Center
| 11–5
|- bgcolor="#edbebf"
| 17
| May 27
| San Miguel
| 98–101
| Tubid (24) 
| 
| 
| Araneta Coliseum
| 11–6

|- bgcolor="#bbffbb"
| 18
| June 3
| Air21
| 121–116
| Nealy (35) Tubid (30)
| Nealy (12) Tubid (12)
| Nealy (5)
| Araneta Coliseum
| 12–6

Transactions

Trades

{| cellspacing="0"
| valign="top" |

Additions

References

Barangay Ginebra San Miguel seasons
Barangay